Casigua-El Cubo is the seat of the Jesús María Semprún municipality, within the Zulia State in northwestern Venezuela. It is located in the south of the Lake Maracaibo, on the banks of the Tarra River.

Transport 
The city is served by the El Cubo Airport .

References 

 Casigua El Cubo
 Emilio Strauss, William Fuenmayor, José Romero.(2000). Atlas del Estado Zulia. 

Cities in Zulia
Populated places established in 1913
1913 establishments in South America